Justice Parker may refer to:

Alton B. Parker (1852–1926), chief judge of the New York Court of Appeals
Amasa J. Parker (1807–1890), justice of the New York Supreme Court and an ex officio judge of the New York Court of Appeals
Charles Wolcott Parker (1862–1948), associate justice of the New Jersey Supreme Court
Emmett N. Parker (1859–1939), associate justice of the Washington Supreme Court
Frank W. Parker (1860–1932), associate justice of the New Mexico Supreme Court
Glenn Parker (judge) (1898–1989), associate justice of the Wyoming Supreme Court
Hubert Parker, Baron Parker of Waddington (1900–1972), Lord Chief Justice of England from 1958 to 1971
Isaac Parker (Massachusetts judge) (1768–1830), associate justice of the Massachusetts Supreme Judicial Court
Jay S. Parker (1895–1969), associate justice of the Kansas Supreme Court
Joel Parker (jurist) (1795–1875), associate justice of the New Hampshire Supreme Court
Joel Parker (politician) (1816–1888), associate justice of the New Jersey Supreme Court
John M. Parker (New York politician) (1805–1873), judge on the New York Court of Appeals
Judith Parker (born 1950), judge in the UK High Court, Family division
R. Hunt Parker (1892–1969), associate justice and chief justice of the North Carolina Supreme Court
Richard Parker (judge, born 1729) (1729–1813), associate justice of the Supreme Court of Appeals of Virginia
Richard E. Parker (1783–1840), associate justice of the Supreme Court of Appeals of Virginia (grandson of the above Richard Parker)
Roger Parker (judge) (1923–2011), Lord Justice of Appeal of the Court of Appeal of England
Sarah Parker (born 1942), chief justice of the North Carolina Supreme Court
Thomas Parker, 1st Earl of Macclesfield (1666–1732), Lord Chief Justice of the Privy Council of England from 1710 to 1718
Tom Parker (judge) (born 1951), associate justice of the Alabama Supreme Court

See also
Judge Parker (disambiguation)